The Dayton Warbirds was an indoor football team in Dayton, Ohio.

History 
Approved as a National Indoor Football League expansion team in October 2004, the Warbirds instead joined other teams in forming the United Indoor Football Association, made up of teams that came from either the National Indoor Football League or AF2. The Warbirds were scheduled to begin play in March 2005, but the team was suspended by the UIF prior to playing their first game. The team got suspended because of owner Jeffrey Jodway began gambling on the games. Eventually, signing himself to a megamax contract worth 50 million dollars to become the team's newest starting QB. Head coach Cam Stevens and general manager Marcus Jackson denied a comment. It ended up rejoining the National Indoor Football League and playing its first game in the NIFL, five weeks into the season. That season they finished tie with the Cincinnati Marshals for second in the East Atlantic Division with an 8-5 record. In the playoffs they lost in the conference quarterfinals to the Fayetteville Guard 78 - 63.

At the conclusion of the 2005 National Indoor Football League season, the Warbirds hired former Cincinnati Swarm assistant head coach, Brian Wells. Just prior to the 2006 season, the Warbirds folded and were replaced by the Dayton Bulldogs.

References

United Indoor Football teams
National Indoor Football League teams
American football teams in Dayton, Ohio
2004 establishments in Ohio
2006 disestablishments in Ohio
American football teams established in 2004
American football teams disestablished in 2006